"Not for Attribution" is the third episode of the fifth season of the HBO original series The Wire. The episode was written by Chris Collins from a story by David Simon & Chris Collins and was directed by Joy Kecken and Scott Kecken. It aired on January 20, 2008.

Plot

A withdrawn Michael is persuaded to take a trip to Six Flags America with Dukie and Bug. The three boys have a fun day at the park, although Michael is later reprimanded by Monk for leaving his corner. Continuing his efforts to create a fake serial killer and draw funding for the police, McNulty falsifies a connection between two old cases involving homeless victims and the corpse which he had earlier staged. The plan fails when both the media and his superiors are uninterested. Bunk remains outraged at McNulty's plan and, after several attempts to talk him out of it, enlists the help of Freamon. However, this tactic backfires when Freamon makes suggestions to improve McNulty's plan by sensationalizing the killer.

Elsewhere, Deputy Commissioner Stan Valchek leaks rising crime statistics to Mayor Carcetti. When Burrell delivers manipulated statistics, the mayor finally has the political ammunition he needs to fire him. Carcetti plans to replace Burrell with Daniels, which his aide Norman Wilson leaks to The Baltimore Sun. Pearlman presents evidence before a grand jury seeking an indictment against Senator Davis on corruption charges. Davis' former driver, Damien Price, testifies under subpoena about the $20,000 in drug money he was arrested with by Daniels' detail. Davis tries desperately to convince Burrell and Carcetti to protect him.

At the Sun, Alma is disappointed when her story on the deadly home invasion doesn't make the front page. The paper copes with budget cuts by offering reporters "buy-outs" to leave their jobs. Templeton, upset that outgoing crime reporter Roger Twigg was given the story on Daniels' promotion, produces a strongly worded "react" quote implicating him in deposing Burrell. When Daniels learns of the quote, he is alarmed that Burrell may use information about his past corruption. Meanwhile, after Vondas rejects Marlo's monetary gift as figuratively and literally "dirty", Marlo seeks help from Proposition Joe in both obtaining fresh bank bills and laundering his money through Caribbean-based charities. Marlo visits the Antilles after Joe helps him with his financial requests, but Joe does not help him find Omar. Marlo then gives a second, clean gift to The Greeks.
 
In spite of being told by Joe that he fears Omar's return to Baltimore, Cheese gives Partlow information on the location of Omar's mentor Butchie in return for Marlo's $50,000 bounty. Partlow and Snoop torture and execute Butchie after shooting Big Guy in the leg, thus ensuring that their actions will reach Omar.

Production

Guest stars

Frankie Faison as Ervin Burrell
Paul Ben-Victor as Spiros "Vondas" Vondopoulos
Robert F. Chew as Proposition Joe
S. Robert Morgan as Butchie
Delaney Williams as Jay Landsman
David Costabile as Thomas Klebanow
Sam Freed as James Whiting
Bruce Kirkpatrick as Roger Twigg
Maria Broom as Marla Daniels
Al Brown as Stanislaus Valchek
Donnell Rawlings as Damien "Day Day" Price
Anwan Glover as Slim Charles
Method Man as Melvin "Cheese" Wagstaff
Felicia Pearson as Felicia "Snoop" Pearson
Michael Stone Forrest as Frank Barlow
Todd Scofield as Jeff Price
Brandon Young as Mike Fletcher
Lenny Hamm as Homicide Detective
Ramon Rodriguez as Renaldo
Gregory L. Williams as Michael Crutchfield
Donald Worden as Donald Worden
Damon Henderson as Pastor
Thuliso Dingwall as Kenard
Kwame Patterson as Monk Metcalf
Edward Green as Spider
Keenon Brice as Bug
Dominick Cicco as Andreas
Sarah Desage as Bank Teller
Michael Rivera as Renaldo's friend
Baye C. Harrell as Hack driver
Kristian King Lewman as Assistant Medical Examiner Diane Lerner
Eric Messner as Alma's Boyfriend
Joey Perillo as Medical Examiner
Tracey Teague as McNulty's date
Vincent M. Ward as Butchie's Bodyguard
John Brennon as Banker #2
Gary D'Addario as Gary DiPasquale
Sarah Grace Hart as Six Flags girl #1
Christine Lee as Store Clerk
Jim Scopeletis as Banker #1
Sophia Wang as Six flags girl #2

Uncredited appearances

Robert Poletick as Steven Luxenberg
Derrick Purvey as Big Guy
Kara Quick as Rebecca Corbett
Steve Luxenberg as Sun staff member

References

External links
"Not for Attribution" at HBO.com

The Wire (season 5) episodes
2008 American television episodes